Interleukin 8 (IL-8 or chemokine (C-X-C motif) ligand 8, CXCL8) is a chemokine produced by macrophages and other cell types such as epithelial cells, airway smooth muscle cells and endothelial cells.  Endothelial cells store IL-8 in their storage vesicles, the Weibel-Palade bodies.  In humans, the interleukin-8 protein is encoded by the CXCL8 gene. IL-8 is  initially produced as a precursor peptide of 99 amino acids which then undergoes cleavage to create several active IL-8 isoforms. In culture, a 72 amino acid peptide is the major form secreted by macrophages.

There are many receptors on the surface membrane capable of binding IL-8; the most frequently studied types are the G protein-coupled serpentine receptors CXCR1 and CXCR2. Expression and affinity for IL-8 differs between the two receptors (CXCR1 > CXCR2). Through a chain of biochemical reactions, IL-8 is secreted and is an important mediator of the immune reaction in the innate immune system response.

Function 
IL-8, also known as neutrophil chemotactic factor, has two primary functions.  It induces chemotaxis in target cells, primarily neutrophils but also other granulocytes, causing them to migrate toward the site of infection. IL-8 also stimulates phagocytosis once they have arrived.  IL-8 is also known to be a potent promoter of angiogenesis. In target cells, IL-8 induces a series of physiological responses required for migration and phagocytosis, such as increases in intracellular Ca2+, exocytosis (e.g. histamine release), and the respiratory burst.

IL-8 can be secreted by any cells with toll-like receptors that are involved in the innate immune response and has been demonstrated to be a signatory chemokine of CR2+ naive T cells, also known as recent thymic emigrants. Usually, it is the macrophages that see an antigen first, and thus are the first cells to release IL-8 to recruit other cells. Both monomer and homodimer forms of IL-8 have been reported to be potent inducers of the chemokine receptors CXCR1 and CXCR2.  The homodimer is more potent, but methylation of Leu25 can block the activity of homodimers.

IL-8 is believed to play a role in the pathogenesis of bronchiolitis, a common respiratory tract disease caused by viral infection.

IL-8 is a member of the CXC chemokine family. The genes encoding this and the other ten members of the CXC chemokine family form a cluster in a region mapped to chromosome 4q.

CXCL-8 mediated chemotaxis of the neutrophil 
CXCL8 is the primary cytokine involved in the recruitment of neutrophils to the site of damage or infection; in a process called chemotaxis. A number of variables are essential for the successful chemotaxis of neutrophils, including the increased expression of high affinity adhesion molecules to secure the neutrophil to the endothelium near the affected site (and is therefore not washed away into the circulatory system), and that the neutrophil can digest its way through the basement membrane and the extracellular matrix (ECM) to reach affected site. CXCL8 plays a key role in inducing the cell signalling necessary to bring about these changes.

Firstly, at the site of infection histamine release causes vasodilation of the capillaries near the injured area which slows down the blood flow in the region and encourages leukocytes, such as neutrophils, to come closer to the endothelium, and away from the centre of the lumen where the rate of blood flow is highest. Once this occurs weak interactions are made between the selectins expressed on the neutrophil and endothelial cells (expression of which is also increased through the action of CXCL8 and other cytokines). On the neutrophil these are: L selectins, and on the endothelial cell: P and E selectins. This causes the "rolling" phase of chemotaxis.

Once the neutrophil is rolling along the endothelium, it will come into contact with a CXCL8 molecule expressed on the surface which stimulates the cell signalling pathway, mediated through a G-coupled-protein-receptor. The binding of CXCL8 to CXCR1/2 on the neutrophil stimulates the neutrophils to upregulate their expression of the integrin, LFA-1, which takes part in high affinity bonding with ICAM-1 receptors expressed on the endothelium. The expression and affinity of LFA-1 is significantly increased to maximise binding. This causes the neutrophil to slow down more until it is stationary. 
Another key function of the cell signalling stimulated by CXCL8, is the initiation of the oxidative burst. This process allows the build up of proteolytic enzymes and reactive oxygen species (ROS) which are necessary to break down the ECM and basement membrane. These are released in secretory granules, along with more integrins. The release of ROS and damaging enzymes is regulated to minimise host damage, but continues to reach site of infection at which it will carry out its effector functions.

Target cells 

While neutrophil granulocytes are the primary target cells of IL-8, there are a relatively wide range of cells (endothelial cells, macrophages, mast cells, and keratinocytes) that respond to this chemokine. The chemoattractant activity of IL-8 in similar concentrations to vertebrates was proven in Tetrahymena pyriformis, which suggests a phylogenetically well-conserved structure and function for this chemokine.

Clinical significance 

Interleukin-8 is a key mediator associated with inflammation where it plays a key role in neutrophil recruitment and neutrophil degranulation. As an example, it has been cited as a proinflammatory mediator in gingivitis and psoriasis.

Interleukin-8 secretion is increased by oxidant stress, which thereby cause the recruitment of inflammatory cells and induces a further increase in oxidant stress mediators, making it a key parameter in localized inflammation. IL-8 was shown to be associated with obesity.

IL-8 has also been implied to have a role in colorectal cancer by acting as an autocrine growth factor for colon carcinoma cell lines or the promotion of division and possible migration by cleaving metalloproteinase molecules. It has also been shown that IL-8 plays an important role in chemoresistance of malignant pleural mesothelioma by inducing expression of transmembrane transporters.

If a pregnant mother has high levels of interleukin-8, there is an increased risk of schizophrenia in her offspring. High levels of Interleukin 8 have been shown to reduce the likelihood of positive responses to antipsychotic medication in schizophrenia.

IL-8 has also been implicated in the pathology of cystic fibrosis. Through its action as a signalling molecule IL-8 is capable of recruiting and guiding neutrophils to the lung epithelium. Overstimulation and dysfunction of these recruited neutrophils within the airways results in release of a number of pro-inflammatory molecules and proteases resulting in further damage of lung tissue.

Some benzodiazepines have inhibitory effects on the adenosine A2B receptor mediated secretion of interleukin-8 in human mast cells. In a 2013 study, diazepam, 4′-chlorodiazepam and flunitrazepam markedly reduced NECA-induced interleukin-8 production in that order of potency, whereas clonazepam showed only a modest inhibition.

Regulation of expression 

The expression of IL-8 is negatively regulated by a number of mechanisms.  MiRNA-146a/b-5p indirectly represses IL-8 expression by silencing the expression of IRAK1.  Additionally, the 3'UTR of IL-8 contains a A/U-rich element that makes it extremely unstable under certain conditions. IL-8 and other inflammatory cytokines form a vicious cycle with the transcription factor NF-κB in cystic fibrosis. NF-κB regulation represents a novel anti-IL-8 therapy for use in inflammatory diseases such as cystic fibrosis. Pathways leading to the induction of ribosomal protein S6 (rpS6) phosphorylation have also been found to enhance IL-8 protein synthesis. This translational control of IL-8 expression is dependent on A/U-rich proximal sequences (APS), which are found in the 3'UTR of IL-8 immediately after the stop codon.

Nomenclature 

IL-8 was renamed CXCL8 by the Chemokine Nomenclature Subcommittee of the International Union of Immunological Societies,. Its approved HUGO gene symbol is CXCL8. Its receptors were similarly renamed: 
 Interleukin 8 receptor, alpha — CXCR1
 Interleukin 8 receptor, beta — CXCR2

References

Further reading 

 
 
 
 
 
 
 
 
 

Cytokines